There are two species of lizard named goldenscale anole:

 Anolis chrysolepis, found in Guyana, Suriname, French Guiana, and Brazil
 Anolis planiceps, found in Venezuela, Guyana, Brazil, and Trinidad

Reptile common names